Katwa College, established in 1948, is one of the oldest colleges in Katwa, in Purba Bardhaman district. It offers undergraduate courses in Arts, Commerce and Sciences. It is affiliated to Burdwan University.

Departments

Science

Chemistry
Physics
Mathematics
Botany
Zoology
Physiology

Arts and Commerce

Bengali
English
Sanskrit
History
Geography
Political Science
Philosophy
Economics
Commerce

Accreditation
The college is recognized by the University Grants Commission (UGC). It was awarded B+ grade by the National Assessment and Accreditation Council (NAAC).

See also

References

External links
Katwa College

Colleges affiliated to University of Burdwan
Educational institutions established in 1948
Universities and colleges in Purba Bardhaman district
1948 establishments in West Bengal